Rehman Khalid (born 4 October 1993) is a Pakistani baseball pitcher. He played for the national team in the 2017 WBC Qualifiers.

References

1993 births
Living people
Pakistani baseball players
Place of birth missing (living people)
21st-century Pakistani people